Webtrends is a private company headquartered in Portland, Oregon, United States. It provides digital analytics, optimization and software related to digital marketing
and e-commerce. It provides services to approximately 2,000 companies.

History
W. Glen Boyd and Eli Shapira founded the company in 1993 as "e.g. Software". 

NetIQ bought the company in 2001. In 2002, NetIQ released a new version of Webtrends Reporting Center (version 5.0). NetIQ sold Webtrends in 2005.

On October 31, 2007, three corporate vice presidents and the CEO were asked to resign. Although there was initial speculation the company was to be quickly sold to its largest competitor, later reports indicated the change signaled a long-term move.

In February 2014, the company hired Joe Davis as its new CEO. In May 2014, the company moved its headquarters from the Pacific First Center to the U.S. Bancorp Tower in Downtown Portland.

Impact
In 2009, Webtrends launched a transit ad campaign revolving around whether or not cyclists should pay a road tax. The ad asked, "Should Cyclists Pay A Road Tax?". Both drivers and the cycling community reacted strongly to the ad, with strident opinion on both sides of the debate. The aim of the campaign was to demonstrate the ability of the company's Web analytics to track the resulting online commentary around the issue.

Acquisitions
Webtrends acquired ClickShift, an automated optimization product in online advertising, in December 2006.
 ClickShift's technology was integrated into Webtrends' Marketing Lab suite, which includes its analytics and marketing warehouse products. The offering was re-branded as Webtrends Dynamic Search. In August 2008, the product was relaunched as Webtrends Ad Director.

Webtrends acquired Seattle based Widemile, a provider of multivariate testing and targeting on July 30, 2009. The product was rebranded and relaunched as Webtrends Optimize the day the acquisition was made public.

Webtrends acquired San Francisco based Transpond, a maker of social microsites and applications that can be distributed over the web or Facebook, on August 10, 2010. The product was rebranded as Webtrends Apps at the time of the announcement and was later rebranded as Webtrends Social.

Webtrends acquired Reinvigorate from Culver City, CA based Media Temple Ventures. Reinvigorate developed a real time analytics web product with visit heat mapping technologies. The product was rebranded as Webtrends Reinvigorate and later discontinued.

Products
Webtrends offers a variety of web analytics products and services which focus on the collection and presentation of user behavior data for websites and mobile device applications.

The New York Times described the company's offerings as "products that analyze spending by Web site visitors."

The core product, Webtrends Analytics, is available in both software and software as a service (SaaS) models. Over the years, Webtrends has released a number of SaaS products including Webtrends Segments, Webtrends Optimize, Action Center, Webtrends Streams and Webtrends Ads. 

A 2012 "integration" deal linked WebTrends and Hootsuite.

Their 2013-released Email remarketing tool helps online marketers deal with in-the-moment data about abandonment of virtual shopping carts by potential customers.

In February 2015, Webtrends Completed the worldwide rollout of Webtrends Explore, their ad-hoc analytics application.

In 2016, Webtrends announced it would release a new analytics product, Webtrends Infinity Analytics; a year later they sold it to Oracle.

On 1st August 2018, a management buy-out saw their testing/personalisation offering Webtrends Optimize spin off into its own company. It became headquartered in the UK, and headed up by the former Director of Optimisation Services Matthew Smith, who took the new role of CEO. Following the split, the Optimize product rebranded, re-platformed, and has been operating on its own ever since.

Data collection
Their software uses log file analysis and page tagging. Log analysis reads the files in which the web server records all its transactions. Via page tagging, parameter name–value pairs are appended (either automatically by a JavaScript "tag" or manual hand-coding) to the query string of a gif image which resides on a data collection server. When a visitor loads the page in a browser, the browser sends a request to the data collection server so that it may load the gif image. The data collection server receives the request and logs the parameters included in the query string of the gif image.

The software analyzes and organizes the captured data into reports for each configured 'Profile'. Reports are viewable by various means, most commonly through a web-based graphic user interface or a scheduled emailed export of the report in PDF or csv format. Collected data can also be viewed via raw log file delivery, REST and ODBC queries, and other products which use the Webtrends Data Extraction API. The web-based report presentation interface is highly configurable, allowing a Webtrends administrator to specify what information should be analyzed, where it should be presented, and to whom it should be available for viewing.

In 2008 the New York Times, which then already owned the International Herald Tribune, used WebTrends to analyze how visitors to the IHT site arrived.  The above data collection process facilitated finding out the importance of search engines.

References

1993 establishments in Oregon
Companies based in Portland, Oregon
Companies established in 1993
Privately held companies based in Oregon
Software companies of the United States
Web analytics